The Historical City Hall of Münster was one of the theatres of the negotiations of the Peace of Westphalia which concluded the Thirty Years' War in Western Europe and the Eighty Years' War between Spain and the Republic of the Seven United Netherlands. It was the site of the Peace of Münster of 1648.

Located in the centre of Prinzipalmarkt, it is the city's predominant landmark – besides Münster Cathedral.

Having been destroyed during World War II, it was rebuilt true to the original from 1950 to 1958.

City and town halls in Germany
Gothic architecture in Germany
Buildings and structures in Münster